The 2006 Fortis Championships Luxembourg was a women's tennis tournament played on indoor hard courts. It was the 11th edition of the Fortis Championships Luxembourg, and was part of the Tier II Series of the 2006 WTA Tour. It was held in Kockelscheuer, Luxembourg.

Points and prize money

Point distribution

Prize money

* per team

Singles main-draw entrants

Seeds

1 Rankings as of 18 September 2006.

Other entrants

The following players received wildcards into the singles main draw:
  Elena Dementieva
  Anne Kremer
  Chanda Rubin

The following players received entry from the qualifying draw:
  Karin Knapp
  Tatjana Malek
  Agnieszka Radwańska
  Roberta Vinci

Doubles main-draw entrants

Seeds

1 Rankings as of 18 September 2006.

Other entrants
The following pair received wildcards into the doubles main draw:
  Kirsten Flipkens /  Yanina Wickmayer

The following pair received entry from the qualifying draw:
  Kristina Barrois /  Agnieszka Radwańska

Champions

Singles

  Alona Bondarenko defeated  Francesca Schiavone, 6–3, 6–2
It was the 1st singles title for Bondarenko in her singles career.

Doubles

  Květa Peschke /  Francesca Schiavone defeated  Anna-Lena Grönefeld /  Liezel Huber, 2–6, 6–4, 6–1
It was the 7th title for Peschke and the 5th title for Schiavone in their respective doubles careers.

References

External links
 Official Results Archive (ITF)
 Official Results Archive (WTA)

Fortis Championships Luxembourg
Luxembourg Open
Fortis Championships Luxembourg